HMS Ossory was a 90-gun second rate ship of the line of the Royal Navy, launched on 24 August 1682 at Portsmouth Dockyard. She was renamed HMS Prince in 1705.

Prince was rebuilt as a 90-gun second rate of the 1706 Establishment at Deptford Dockyard, from where she was relaunched on 21 July 1711. She was renamed HMS Princess on 2 January 1716, and subsequently renamed HMS Princess Royal on 26 July 1728.

Princess Royal continued to serve until 1773, when she was broken up.

Notes

References

Lavery, Brian (2003) The Ship of the Line - Volume 1: The development of the battlefleet 1650-1850. Conway Maritime Press. .

Ships of the line of the Royal Navy
1680s ships